Population Control: Real Costs, Illusory Benefits  is a nonfiction book by Steven W. Mosher, first published in 2008.
Population Control is a detailed exposition on the global effort to combat overpopulation, arguing that not only population control is immoral in many cases, but that overpopulation is a myth.

Mosher was first exposed to population control policies when he visited China as an undergraduate sociologist in 1979 to conduct anthropological research. While there, he documented the implementation of China's one child policy with forced abortions firsthand.

The author who leads the Population Research Institute opposes the standard Malthusian idea that overpopulation is a threat to human prosperity and future.

See also
A Mother's Ordeal
Human population control

References

External links
 Pop.org

American political books
English-language books
2008 non-fiction books
2008 in the environment
Works about human overpopulation
Demography books
Transaction Publishers books